Udhavrao Sahebrao Patil (1920-1984) was an Indian politician. He was the leader of the Peasants and Workers Party of India (PWP). 
He was elected to the Lok Sabha, the lower house of the Parliament of India as a member of the Peasants and Workers Party of India.

He is an Agriculturist. He was Secretary of Maratha Education Society, 1945. He is previously associated with Congress And took part in Independence Movement from 1945 to 1947. 
He was a member of the Hyderabad Legislative Assembly from 1952—57. He was Secretary, Peasants and Workers Party, from 1953—55. He was a member of the Maharashtra Legislative Assembly from 1957—62 And again from 1967—71. 
He was the Leader of the Opposition in the Maharashtra Legislative Assembly in 1958. He offered Satyagraha in Belgaon for Sanyukta Maharashtra in 1959.
He becomes a member of the Rajya Sabha from 1964—67.

He was Chairman of the Public Accounts Committee, Maharashtra, 1969-71. He was Director of Maharashtra State Co-operative Land Development Bank Ltd. 1973—77. He was imprisoned for two months in 1976 under Defence of India Rules.
He was a Member of the Estimates Committee in 1977. 
He was a member of (i) Terna Sakhar Karkhana, Dhoki, Osmanabad (ii)  BHOGAWATI SAHAKARI SAKHAR KARKHANA, VAIRAG, Barshi, Solapur.

References

External links
Official biographical sketch in Parliament of India website

India MPs 1977–1979
Lok Sabha members from Maharashtra
1920 births
1984 deaths